The Marañón River is the principal or mainstem source of the Amazon River, arising about 160 km to the northeast of Lima, Peru, and flowing through a deeply eroded Andean valley in a northwesterly direction, along the eastern base of the Cordillera of the Andes, as far as 5° 36′ southern latitude; from where it makes a great bend to the northeast, and cuts through the jungle Andes, until at the Pongo de Manseriche it flows into the flat Amazon basin. Although historically, the term "Marañon River" often was applied to the river all the way to the Atlantic Ocean, nowadays the Marañon River is generally thought to end at the confluence with the Ucayali River, after which most cartographers label the ensuing waterway the Amazon River.

Geography
The Marañón River is Peru's second-longest river, according to a 2005 statistical publication by the Instituto Nacional de Estadística e Informática.

Source of the Amazon 
The Marañon River was considered the source of the Amazon River starting with the 1707 map published by Padre Samuel Fritz, who indicated the great river “has its source on the southern shore of a lake that is called Lauriocha, near Huánuco." Fritz believed that the Marañón contributed the most water of all the Amazon's tributaries, making it the most important headstream. For most of the 18th–19th centuries and into the 20th century, the Marañon River was generally considered the source of the Amazon. Later explorations have proposed two headwaters rivers of the Marañon in the high Andes as sources of the Amazon: the Lauricocha and Nupe Rivers. The Lauricocha and Nupe unite near the village of Rondos to form from their confluence downstream the river that is called the Marañon.

Although the Apurimac and Mantaro rivers also have claims to being the source of the Amazon, the Marañon River continues to claim the title of the "mainstem source" or "hydrological source" of the Amazon due to its contribution of the highest annual discharge rates.

Description 

The initial section of the Marañon contains a plethora of pongos, which are gorges in the jungle areas often with difficult rapids.
The Pongo de Manseriche is the final pongo on the Marañon located just before the river enters the flat Amazon basin. According to Captain Carbajal, who attempted ascent through the Pongo de Manseriche in the little steamer Napo, in 1868, it is a vast rent in the Andes about 600 m (2000 ft) deep, narrowing in places to a width of only 30 m (100 ft), the precipices "seeming to close in at the top." Through this canyon, the Marañón leaps along, at times, at the rate of 20 km/h (12 mi/h). The pongo is known for wrecking many ships and many drownings.

Downstream of the Pongo de Manseriche, the river often has islands, and usually nothing is visible from its low banks, but an immense forest-covered plain known as the selva baja (low jungle) or Peruvian Amazonia. It is home to indigenous peoples such as the Urarina of the Chambira Basin , the Candoshi, and the Cocama-Cocamilla peoples.

A 552-km (343-mi) section of the Marañon River between Puente Copuma (Puchka confluence) and Corral Quemado is a class IV raftable river that is similar in many ways to the Grand Canyon of the United States, and has been labeled the "Grand Canyon of the Amazon". Most of this section of the river is in a canyon that is up to 3000 m deep on both sides – over twice the depth of the Colorado's Grand Canyon. It is in dry, desert-like terrain, much of which receives only 250–350 mm/rain per year (10–14 in/yr) with parts such as from Balsas to Jaén known as the hottest infierno area of Peru. The Marañon Grand Canyon section flows by the village of Calemar, where Peruvian writer Ciro Alegría based one of his most important novels, La serpiente de oro (1935).

Historical journeys

La Condamine, 1743 
One of the first popular descents of the Marañon River occurred in 1743, when Frenchman Charles Marie de La Condamine journeyed from the Chinchipe confluence all the way to the Atlantic Ocean. La Condamine did not descend the initial section of the Marañon by boat due to the pongos.  From where he began his boating descent at the Chiriaco confluence, La Condamine still had to confront several pongos, including the Pongo de Huaracayo (or Guaracayo) and the Pongo de Manseriche.

The Grand Canyon of the Amazon 

The upper Marañon River has seen a number of descents. An attempt to paddle the river was made by Herbert Rittlinger in 1936. Sebastian Snow was an adventurer who journeyed down most of the river by trekking to Chiriaco River starting at the source near Lake Niñacocha.

In 1976 and/or 1977, Laszlo Berty descended the section from Chagual to the jungle in raft. In 1977, a group composed of Tom Fisher, Steve Gaskill, Ellen Toll, and John Wasson spent over a month descending the river from Rondos to Nazareth with kayaks and a raft.  In 2004, Tim Biggs and companions kayaked the entire river from the Nupe River to Iquitos.  In 2012, Rocky Contos descended the entire river with various companions along the way.

Hydroelectric dams 
The Marañon River may supply 20 hydroelectric megadams planned in the Andes, and most of the power is thought to be destined for export to Brazil, Chile, or Ecuador. Dam survey crews have drafted construction blueprints, and the environmental impact statements have been available since November 2009 for the Veracruz dam, and since November 2011, the Chadin2 dam. 
A 2011 law stated "national demand" for the hydroelectric energy, while in 2013, Peruvian President Ollanta Humala explicitly made a connection with mining; the energy is to supply mines in the Cajamarca Region, La Libertad, Ancash Region, and Piura Region. Construction of the 406 MW dam in Chaglla District started in 2012.

Concerns
Opposition arose because the dams are expected to disrupt the major source of the Amazon, alter normal silt deposition into the lower river, damage habitat and migration patterns for fish and other aquatic life, displace thousands of residents along the river, and damage a national treasure "at least as nice as the Grand Canyon in the USA". Residents have launched efforts to halt the dams along the river with conservation groups such as SierraRios and International Rivers.

Potential ecological impacts of 151 new dams greater than 2 MW on five of the six major Andean tributaries of the Amazon over the next 20 years are estimated to be high, including the first major break in connectivity between Andean headwaters and lowland Amazon and deforestation due to infrastructure.

See also
 Extinct languages of the Marañón River basin
List of rivers of Peru
 Loreto Region
 Maina Indians
World Commission on Dams

References 

Rivers of Peru
Tributaries of the Amazon River
Rivers
Upper Amazon